Sergio Godoy may refer to:

 Sergio Godoy (Guatemalan cyclist) (born 1973)
 Sergio Godoy (Argentine cyclist) (born 1988)
 Marcus Sergio Godoy (1881–1957), bishop of Maracaibo

See also
 Sergio Cortés (Sergio Cortés Godoy, born 1968), Chilean tennis player